Psychopathology is the study of abnormal cognition, behaviour, and experiences which differs according to social norms and rests upon a number of constructs that are deemed to be the social norm at any particular era.

Biological psychopathology is the study of the biological etiology of abnormal cognitions, behaviour and experiences. Child psychopathology is a specialisation applied to children and adolescents. Animal psychopathology is a specialisation applied to non-human animals. This concept is linked to the philosophical ideas first outlined by Galton (1869) and is linked to the appliance of eugenical ideations around what constitutes the human.

History
Early explanations for mental illnesses were influenced by religious belief and superstition. Psychological conditions that are now classified as mental disorders were initially attributed to possessions by evil spirits, demons, and the devil. This idea was widely accepted up until the sixteenth and seventeenth centuries. Individuals who had these so-called "possessions" were tortured as treatment or as Foucault outlines in the History of Madness: viewed as seers (Joan of Arc). Religious practitioners used this technique in hoping to bring their patients back to sanity but increasingly there was the shift to the great confinement.

The Greek physician Hippocrates was one of the first to reject the idea that mental disorders were caused by possession of demons or the devil. He firmly believed the symptoms of mental disorders were due to diseases originating in the brain. Hippocrates suspected that these states of insanity were due to imbalances of fluids in the body. He identified these fluids to be four in particular: blood, black bile, yellow bile, and phlegm. This later became the basis of the chemical imbalance theory used widely within the present.

Furthermore, not far from Hippocrates, the philosopher Plato would come to argue the mind, body, and spirit worked as a unit. Any imbalance brought to these compositions of the individual could bring distress or lack of harmony within the individual. This philosophical idea would remain in perspective until the seventeenth century. It was later challenged by Laing (1960) along with Laing and Esterson (1964) who noted that it was the family environment that led to the formation of adaptive strategies.

In the eighteenth century's Romantic Movement, the idea that healthy parent-child relationships provided sanity became a prominent idea. Philosopher Jean-Jacques Rousseau introduced the notion that trauma in childhood could have negative implications later in adulthood.

The scientific discipline of psychopathology was founded by Karl Jaspers in 1913. It was referred to as "static understanding" and its purpose was to graphically recreate the "mental phenomenon" experienced by the client.

In the nineteenth century, greatly influenced by Rousseau's ideas and philosophy, Austrian psychoanalyst Sigmund Freud would bring about psychotherapy and become the father of psychoanalysis, a clinical method for treating psychopathology through dialogue between a patient and a psychoanalyst. Talking therapy would originate from his ideas on the individual's experiences and the natural human efforts to make sense of the world and life. In the Wednesday meetings at Vienna, Adler took another perspective and stated it was rooted in the social life of the individual as outlined in his collected works (Adler, 1999).

As the study of psychiatric disorders

The study of psychopathology is interdisciplinary, with contributions coming from clinical psychology, abnormal psychology, social psychology, and developmental psychology, as well as neuropsychology and other psychology subdisciplines. Other related fields include psychiatry, neuroscience, criminology, social work, sociology, epidemiology, and statistics.

Psychopathology can be broadly separated into descriptive and explanatory. Descriptive psychopathology involves categorising, defining and understanding symptoms as reported by people and observed through their behaviour which are then assessed according to a social norm. Explanatory psychopathology looks to find explanations for certain kinds of symptoms according to theoretical models such as psychodynamics, cognitive behavioural therapy or through understanding how they have been constructed by drawing upon Constructivist Grounded Theory (Charmaz, 2016) or Interpretative Phenomenological Analysis (Smith, Flowers & Larkin, 2013).

There are several ways to characterise the presence of psychopathology in an individual as a whole. One strategy is to assess a person along four dimensions: deviance, distress, dysfunction, and danger, known collectively as the four Ds. Another conceptualisation, the p factor, sees psychopathology as a general, overarching construct that influences psychiatric symptoms.

The four Ds
A description of the four Ds when defining abnormality:

Deviance: this term describes the idea that specific thoughts, behaviours and emotions are considered deviant when they are unacceptable or not common in society. Clinicians must, however, remember that minority groups are not always deemed deviant just because they may not have anything in common with other groups. Therefore, we define an individual's actions as deviant or abnormal when their behaviour is deemed unacceptable by the culture they belong to. However, many disorders have a relation between patterns of deviance and therefore need to be evaluated in a differential diagnostic model.
Distress: this term accounts for negative feelings by the individual with the disorder. They may feel deeply troubled and affected by their illness. Behaviours and feelings that cause distress to individuals or to others around them are considered abnormal if the condition is upsetting to the person experiencing it. Distress is related to dysfunction by being a useful asset in accurately perceiving dysfunction in an individual's life. These two are not always related because an individual can be highly dysfunctional and at the same time experience minimal stress. The important characteristic of distress is not dysfunction; rather it is the limit to which an individual is stressed by an issue.
Dysfunction: this term involves maladaptive behaviour that impairs the individual's ability to perform normal daily functions, such as getting ready for work in the morning, or driving a car. This maladaptive behaviour has to be a problem large enough to be considered a diagnosis. It's highly noted to look for dysfunction across an individual's life experience because there is a chance the dysfunction may appear in clear observable view and in places where it is less likely to appear. Such maladaptive behaviours prevent the individual from living a normal, healthy lifestyle. However, dysfunctional behaviour is not always caused by a disorder; it may be voluntary, such as engaging in a hunger strike.
Danger: this term involves dangerous or violent behaviour directed at the individual, or others in the environment. The two important characteristics of danger is, danger to self and danger to others. When diagnosing, there is a large vulnerability of danger in which there is some danger in each diagnosis and within these diagnoses there is a continuum of severity. An example of dangerous behaviour that may suggest a psychological disorder is engaging in suicidal activity. Behaviours and feelings that are potentially harmful to an individual or the individuals around them are seen as abnormal.

The p factor
Benjamin Lahey and colleagues first proposed a general "psychopathology factor" in 2012, or simply "p factor". This construct shares its conceptual similarity with the g factor of general intelligence. Instead of conceptualising psychopathology as consisting of several discrete categories of mental disorders, the p factor is dimensional and influences whether psychiatric symptoms in general are present or absent. The symptoms that are present then combine to form several distinct diagnoses. The p factor is modelled in the Hierarchical Taxonomy of Psychopathology. Although researchers initially conceived a three factor explanation for psychopathology generally, subsequent study provided more evidence for a single factor that is sequentially comorbid, recurrent/chronic, and exists on a continuum of severity and chronicity.

Higher scores on the p factor dimension have been found to be correlated with higher levels of functional impairment, greater incidence of problems in developmental history, and more diminished early-life brain function. In addition, those with higher levels of the p factor are more likely to have inherited a genetic predisposition to mental illness. The existence of the p factor may explain why it has been "... challenging to find causes, consequences, biomarkers, and treatments with specificity to individual mental disorders."

A 2020 review of the p factor found that many studies support its validity and that it is generally stable throughout one's life. A high p factor is associated with many adverse effects, including poor academic performance, impulsivity, criminality, suicidality, reduced foetal growth, lower executive functioning, and a greater number of psychiatric diagnoses. A partial genetic basis for the p factor has also been supported.

Alternatively, the p factor has also been interpreted as an index of general impairment rather than being a specific index that causes psychopathology.

As mental symptoms
The term psychopathology may also be used to denote behaviours or experiences which are indicative of mental illness, even if they do not constitute a formal diagnosis. For example, the presence of hallucinations may be considered as a psychopathological sign, even if there are not enough symptoms present to fulfil the criteria for one of the disorders listed in the DSM or ICD.

In a more general sense, any behaviour or experience which causes impairment, distress or disability, particularly if it is thought to arise from a functional breakdown in either the cognitive or neurocognitive systems in the brain, may be classified as psychopathology. It remains unclear how strong the distinction between maladaptive traits and mental disorders actually is, e.g. neuroticism is often described as the personal level of minor psychiatric symptoms.

Diagnostic and Statistical Manual of Mental Disorders

The Diagnostic and Statistical Manual of Mental Disorders (DSM) is a guideline for the diagnosis and understanding of mental disorders. It serves as reference for a range of professionals in medicine and mental health in the United States particularly. These professionals include psychologists, counsellors, physicians, social workers, psychiatric nurses and nurse practitioners, marriage and family therapists, and more.

See also 

 Adverse Childhood Experiences movement
 Biological psychiatry
 Cerebral atrophy
 Evidence-based medicine
 Glossary of psychiatry
 Neurodegeneration
 Neuroimmunology
 Neuroinflammation
 Stress in early childhood
 Traumatic brain injury

References

Further reading 
 Atkinson, L et al. (2004). Attachment Issues in Psychopathology and Intervention. Lawrence Erlbaum.
 Berrios, G.E.(1996) The History of Mental Symptoms: Descriptive Psychopathology since the 19th century. Cambridge, Cambridge University Press, 
 Freud, S (1916) The Psychopathology of Everyday Life. MacMillan.
 Keating, D P et al. (1991). Constructivist Perspectives on Developmental Psychopathology and Atypical Development. Lawrence Erlbaum.
 Maddux, J E et al. (2005). Psychopathology: Foundations for a Contemporary Understanding. Lawrence Erlbaum.
 McMaster University. (2011). Psychological disorders. In Discover psychology (pp. 154–155, 157–158, 162–164) [Introduction]. Toronto, ON: Nelson Education.
 Sims, A. (2002) Symptoms in the Mind: An Introduction to Descriptive Psychopathology (3rd ed). Elsevier. 
 Widiger, T A et al. (2000). Adult Psychopathology: Issues and Controversies. Annual Review of Psychology.

 
Abnormal psychology
Pathology